Dimitar Dimitrov Tonev (born 15 October 2001) is a Bulgarian professional footballer who plays as a midfielder for First Professional Football League club Pirin Blagoevgrad on loan from Botev Plovdiv.

Club career
On 19 October 2019, four days after his 18th birthday, Tonev made his senior debut for Botev Plovdiv, during their league defeat against Ludogorets, featuring 77 minutes in a 1–0 loss. On 13 January 2020, he signed his first professional contract with the club. On 4 March 2020, Tonev scored his first competitive goal for Botev in a 1–0 Bulgarian Cup third round victory over Botev Galabovo.

Career statistics

References

External links
 

2001 births
Living people
Bulgarian footballers
Bulgaria under-21 international footballers
Bulgaria youth international footballers
First Professional Football League (Bulgaria) players
Botev Plovdiv players
PFC Pirin Blagoevgrad players
Association football midfielders